"Some Beach" is a song written by Rory Feek and Paul Overstreet and recorded by American country music artist Blake Shelton.  It was released in July 2004 as the second single from Shelton's 2004 album Blake Shelton's Barn & Grill. The song became Shelton's third number one hit on the U.S. Billboard Hot Country Songs chart and spent four weeks at that position.

Content
The narrator deals with frustrations, such as being flipped off in traffic on the highway and having to wait all afternoon at the dentist's office, by wishing that he were "on some beach, somewhere." The song's title is a double entendre, playing on a Southern United States dialectal form of the epithet "son of a bitch" ("som' bitch").

Music video
The music video was directed by Peter Zavadil, and features Shelton driving a pickup truck down a freeway, trying to park the truck, and going to the dentist.

The video features NASCAR driver Elliott Sadler.

Chart performance
"Some Beach" debuted at number 51 on the U.S. Billboard Hot Country Songs for the chart week of August 7, 2004.

Year-end charts

Certifications

References

External links
 

2004 singles
Blake Shelton songs
Warner Records Nashville singles
Songs written by Paul Overstreet
Songs written by Rory Feek
Music videos directed by Peter Zavadil
Songs about beaches
2004 songs